Lampanyctus iselinoides is a species of lanternfish. They live at a depth of at least 64m.

References

External links

Lampanyctus
Fish described in 1965